Debra Sinclair (born March 11, 1969) is an American sports shooter. She competed in the women's 10 metre air rifle event at the 1992 Summer Olympics.

References

External links
 

1969 births
Living people
American female sport shooters
Olympic shooters of the United States
Shooters at the 1992 Summer Olympics
Sportspeople from Portland, Oregon
Pan American Games medalists in shooting
Pan American Games gold medalists for the United States
Shooters at the 1991 Pan American Games
Medalists at the 1991 Pan American Games
21st-century American women